Cho Cheng-Chi (born 21 October 1998 in Tainan) is a Taiwanese swimer, currently resident in New Taipei city, Taiwan. He represents New Taipei City in Taiwanese National Games.

Cheng-Chi is currently studying in the Department and Graduate Institute of Business Administration in National Taiwan University (graduating in June 2021).

Achievements

References

1997 births
Living people
Sportspeople from New Taipei
Taiwanese male swimmers
21st-century Taiwanese people
Swimmers at the 2014 Asian Games
Swimmers at the 2018 Asian Games